Fredrik Jörgen "Fredde" Granberg, (born 11 November 1970 in Spånga) is a Swedish actor, playwright and director, perhaps mostly known for his role in the Ronny and Ragge comedy series, which he played along with actor Peter Settman. In the 2013 Julkalendern on SVT, he played the lead role in Barna Hedenhös.

References

External links

21st-century Swedish actors
1970 births
Living people
Swedish male actors